Dufferin,  Dyffryn or Duffryn may refer to:

Places

In Burma
 Fort Dufferin, the British name for Mandalay Palace during their colonial rule

In Canada

British Columbia
 Dufferin Island, 
 Dufferin, neighbourhood of the city of Kamloops, from 1971 to 1973 a separate municipality

Manitoba
 Dufferin (Manitoba provincial electoral district)
 Fort Dufferin, a National Historic Site
 Rural Municipality of Dufferin

New Brunswick
 Dufferin Parish, a civil parish east of St. Stephen, New Brunswick

Nova Scotia
 Port Dufferin, a small community near Halifax

Ontario
 Dufferin Bridge, a community in Magnetawan
 Dufferin County
 Dufferin (electoral district), a federal electoral district in Ontario, abolished in 1924
 Dufferin Islands, a group of man-made islands near Niagara Falls
 Dufferin Street in Toronto
Dufferin (TTC), a subway station on the street

Quebec
 Terrasse Dufferin, a broad terrace wrapping around much of old Quebec City

Saskatchewan
 Rural Municipality of Dufferin No. 190, Saskatchewan

In the United Kingdom

Northern Ireland
 Dufferin (barony), County Down

Wales
Dyffryn is Welsh for 'valley'.
Duffryn, a housing estate in Newport
Dyffryn, Bridgend
Dyffryn Cennen, Carmarthenshire
Dyffryn, Ceredigion
Dyffryn, Pembrokeshire
Dyffryn, Vale of Glamorgan
Dyffryn Gardens
Dyffryn Cellwen, Neath Port Talbot
Dyffryn Clydach, Neath Port Talbot

People
 Baron Dufferin and Claneboye, title in the Peerage of Ireland
 Dufferin Roblin (1917–2010), Canadian businessman and politician, 14th Premier of Manitoba
 Frederick Hamilton-Temple-Blackwood, 1st Marquess of Dufferin and Ava (1826–1902), known as Lord Dufferin, Governor-General of Canada and Viceroy of India

Bridges
 Dufferin Street bridges in Toronto, Ontario, Canada
 Malviya Bridge over the Ganges at Varanasi, India, originally named the Dufferin Bridge.

Ships

 HMIS Dufferin, a Royal Indian Marine ship active in World War I
 Training Ship Dufferin, a training ship based in Mumbai, renamed Training Ship Chanakya